WCNK (98.7 FM) is a radio station broadcasting a country music format. Licensed to Key West, Florida, United States, the station serves the Florida Keys. The station is currently owned by Robert Holladay, through licensee Florida Keys Media, LLC, and features programming from AP Radio.

History
The station went on the air as WOZN on 1984-12-18. On 1996-08-23, the station changed its call sign to WBKW, and on 1996-11-18, to the current WCNK.

In August 2013, Gamma Broadcasting, LLC reached a deal to sell its Florida Keys stations (including WCNK) to Florida Keys Media, LLC (a company controlled by Robert H. Holladay). The sale of WCNK and sister station WWUS, at a price of $475,000, was consummated on January 31, 2014.

References

External links

Radio stations established in 1984
CNK
1984 establishments in Florida
Country radio stations in the United States